The United Nations Special Coordinator for the Middle East Peace Process, formerly known as the United Nations Special Coordinator (UNSCO), "represents the Secretary-General and leads the UN system in all political and diplomatic efforts related to the peace process, including in the Middle East Quartet" and also "coordinates the humanitarian and development work of UN agencies and programmes in the occupied Palestinian territory, in support of the Palestinian Authority and the Palestinian people". 

Established in June 1994 following the signing of the Oslo Accords, it sought to facilitate the transition process and to "respond to the needs of the Palestinian people". 

List of United Nations Special Coordinators (for the Middle East Peace Process)
 Robert Serry  (November 2007 - 5 February 2015)
 Nickolay Mladenov  (2015-2020)
 Tor Wennesland  (2021-)

See also
Israel and the United Nations
Palestine and the United Nations

References

External links
Official website

Israeli–Palestinian peace process